Simon Harris (born 17 October 1986) is an Irish Fine Gael politician who has served as Minister for Further and Higher Education, Research, Innovation and Science since June 2020. He has also been serving as Minister for Justice since December 2022 to facilitate the maternity leave of Helen McEntee. He has been a Teachta Dála (TD) for the Wicklow constituency since 2011. He previously served as Minister for Health from 2016 to 2020 and Minister of State at the Department of Finance from 2014 to 2016.

After an initial period on the backbenches as the Baby of the Dáil, Harris was promoted to the position of Minister of State at the Department of Finance in 2014.

Following the formation of a Fine Gael minority government in May 2016, Harris was appointed to the cabinet as Minister for Health.

Following the formation of the Government of the 33rd Dáil in June 2020, Harris was appointed as Minister for Further and Higher Education, Research, Innovation and Science.

Early life
Harris was born in Greystones, County Wicklow, in 1986. He is the eldest of three children born to Bart and Mary Harris. A great-uncle of his was a Fine Gael Councillor in Dún Laoghaire.

Harris was educated at St. David's Holy Faith Secondary School, in Greystones, and first became involved in local politics as a fifteen-year-old when he set up the North Wicklow Triple A Alliance to help the families of children with autism spectrum disorders and attention deficit disorder. As a Junior Certificate student, he lobbied politicians to get better facilities to allow children with such disabilities to be integrated into mainstream education.

He initially studied Journalism and French, at the Dublin Institute of Technology, but dropped out in first year to pursue politics full-time.

Early political career
Harris began working as an assistant to his future cabinet colleague Frances Fitzgerald in 2008, when she was a member of Seanad Éireann. In 2009, Harris was elected to Wicklow County Council with the highest percentage vote of any County Councillor in Ireland. He was simultaneously elected to Greystones Town Council.

As a councillor, he served as chairperson of the County Wicklow Joint Policing Committee and Chairperson of the HSE Regional Health Forum. He was a member of Wicklow County Council's Housing Strategic Policy Committee and Wicklow Vocational Educational Committee.

Harris was elected to Dáil Éireann in 2011, taking the third seat in the Wicklow constituency. As the youngest deputy in the 31st Dáil, he was selected by Fine Gael to nominate Enda Kenny for Taoiseach, making his maiden speech.

Despite being a first-time backbench TD, Harris served as a member of the high-profile Dáil Public Accounts Committee (PAC) and the Joint Oireachtas Committee on Finance, Public Expenditure, and Reform. He was also a member of the Oireachtas cross-party group on Mental Health, and introduced the Mental Health (Anti-Discrimination) Bill 2013, in June 2013.

Harris ran unsuccessfully as a Fine Gael candidate in the South constituency at the 2014 European Parliament election.

In government

Minister of State
Harris was appointed to the top junior ministerial position, as Minister of State at the Department of Finance with responsibility for the Office of Public Works, Public Procurement, and International Banking, on 15 July 2014.

During a period of intense flooding throughout the country during the winter of 2015 and 2016, Harris was forced to deny accusations that the government had left €13m in the budget for flood relief works in 2015, unspent while he had also secured funding for flood defences in his own constituency.

Minister for Health
Harris was appointed to the cabinet, on 6 May 2016, when he became Minister for Health. Some of the immediate problems facing him in his new post included over-crowding in emergency departments and long waiting lists, as well as soaring demands and huge cost overruns.

In his first year in the job, Harris faced the possibility of 30,000 health workers and 40,000 nurses going on strike.

These developments occurred the same week that the Irish Nurses and Midwives Organisation announced that there had been a record 612 patients admitted for care on trolleys in hospitals around the country on the morning on 3 January 2017. The planned strikes were later called off.

In 2016, Harris also contributed to the "A Healthy Weight for Ireland – Obesity Policy and Action Plan 2016–2025". A policy outlining "the Government's desire to assist its people to achieve better health, and in particular to reduce the levels of overweight and obesity". Harris claims that "the approach taken in developing this policy was based on the Government framework for improved health and wellbeing of Ireland".

In 2017, Harris was accused of "practising hypocrisy" over his stance on the Sisters of Charity's controversial ownership of the National Maternity Hospital. The controversy saw the resignations of Dr. Peter Boylan and Prof. Chris Fitzpatrick, from the board of the hospital. The Religious Sisters of Charity later relinquished ownership of three hospitals: St. Vincent's University Hospital in Dublin, St. Vincent's Private, and St. Michael's.

He was re-appointed when Leo Varadkar succeeded Kenny as Taoiseach in June 2017. Harris supported the legalisation of abortion in Ireland, and introduced the Health (Regulation of Termination of Pregnancy) Bill 2018 into the Dáil on 27 September 2018.

On 26 April 2018, the HSE confirmed that 206 women developed cervical cancer after having a screening test which was subsequently deemed to be potentially inaccurate on lookback, once a woman presented with a confirmed diagnosis of Cervical Cancer and given the known limitations of screening using smear technology. In the resulting scandal, Harris was criticised for his handling of the matter on multiple occasions.

On 20 February 2019, Simon Harris survived a motion of no-confidence over his handling of the new National Children's Hospital rising costs (over €2 billion). The motion was voted down by 58 votes to 53 with 37 abstentions.

Harris introduced the Health (Preservation and Protection and other Emergency Measures in the Public Interest) Act 2020, emergency legislation in response to the COVID-19 pandemic, which was enacted on 20 March 2020.

Minister for Further and Higher Education, Research, Innovation and Science
Harris was appointed as Minister for Further and Higher Education, Research, Innovation and Science on 27 June 2020, leading a new department in the government led by Micheál Martin.

On 4 May 2022, he published "Funding our Future", a new policy on sustainably funding higher education and reducing the cost of third level education for students and families.

Harris was the Fine Gael Director of Elections for councillor James Geoghegan's campaign in the 2021 Dublin Bay South by-election.

Following Leo Varadkar's appointment as Taoiseach on 17 December 2022, he was re-appointed to the same position, as well as Minister for Justice on a temporary basis during the maternity leave of Helen McEntee.

Personal life
Harris is the eldest of three children; he has a younger sister and a younger brother. His brother Adam, is the CEO of the national autism charity foundation AsIAm, who was himself diagnosed with autism at a young age. Harris has credited his brother for inspiring him to get involved in autism advocacy early on in his political career. 
Harris suffers from Crohn's disease. In 2017, he married Caoimhe Wade, a cardiac nurse. They have one daughter and one son.

References

External links

Simon Harris's page on the Fine Gael website

1986 births
Living people
Fine Gael TDs
Local councillors in County Wicklow
Members of the 31st Dáil
Members of the 32nd Dáil
Members of the 33rd Dáil
Ministers for Health (Ireland)
Ministers of State of the 31st Dáil
Politicians from Dublin (city)
Ministers for Justice (Ireland)